The 1984 Preakness Stakes was the 109th running of the $350,000 Grade 1 Preakness Stakes thoroughbred horse race. The race took place on May 19, 1984, and was televised in the United States on the ABC television network. Gate Dancer, who was jockeyed by Angel Cordero, won the race by one and one half lengths over runner-up Play On. Approximate post time was 5:41 p.m. Eastern Time. The race was run over a fast track in a final time of 1:53-3/5.  The Maryland Jockey Club reported total attendance of 80,566, this is recorded as second highest on the list of American thoroughbred racing top attended events for North America in 1984.

Payout 

The 110th Preakness Stakes Payout Schedule

$2 Exacta:  (3–10) paid   $106.60

The full chart 

 Winning Breeder: William R. Davis; (FL)
 Winning Time: 1:53 3/5
 Track Condition: Fast
 Total Attendance: 81,235

References

External links 

 

1984
1984 in horse racing
Horse races in Maryland
1984 in American sports
1984 in sports in Maryland